Eyal Podell (born November 11, 1975) is an Israeli-American actor and screenwriter. He is best known for his portrayals of Professor Adrian Korbel in the soap opera The Young and the Restless, Evram Mintz in Defying Gravity, and Namir Eschel in NCIS.

With partner Jonathon E. Stewart, he wrote the screenplay or story for the films Cars 3 (2017), The Angry Birds Movie 2 (2019), and Scoob! (2020).

Early life
Podell was born in Tel Aviv, Israel, to a family of Jewish background. After spending the first two years of his childhood in Israel, Eyal and his family relocated to the United States for a year and then moved to Hong Kong, where he lived until the age of eight. Upon his return to the United States, his family settled in New York's Westchester County. He attended Byram Hills High School in Armonk with fellow actors Sean Maher and David Harbour. He is a graduate of Dartmouth College in Hanover, New Hampshire.

Career
Since arriving in Los Angeles, Eyal has worked consistently in both film and television. His big-screen debut came playing Al Pacino's son in The Insider. He was trained as a classical actor at the National Theater Institute, part of the Eugene O'Neill Theater Center. Most recently, Eyal has appeared on NCIS: New Orleans as Samuel Wilkns. In addition to acting, he is also a writer.

Personal life
He is the grandson of the late Odif and Judy Podell, co-founders of the modern architectural community, Usonia Homes in Pleasantville, New York. He is working on adapting the story of Usonia to film.

Filmography

References

External links
 

1975 births
American male soap opera actors
Israeli Jews
Israeli emigrants to the United States
American people of Israeli descent
Living people
People from Tel Aviv
People from Armonk, New York
Jewish American writers
Sony Pictures Animation people
21st-century American Jews